Simple system flute most commonly refers to the type of flute manufactured and favored by classical European musicians during the Classical era.  This type of flute is the direct precursor of, and was made obsolete within the art music world by, the introduction of the Boehm system flute.  Subsequently, many simple system flutes were integrated into folk music (including Irish folk music and Cuban charanga bands).

Physical characteristics 

The simple system flute had a cylindrical head joint and a reverse tapered body. The six main tone holes were heavily undercut to produce even intonation and registration while providing even finger spacing.  French simple system flutes (or "five-key flutes") from this era typically had five keys that enabled the flute to play in any key.  English and German models were typically designed with eight keys: the five of the five-key flute, plus an alternate F key running along the instrument, and two keys on the foot joint to extend the lower register down to middle C.

Alternative meaning
Simple system flute may also refer to any flute with tone holes played by the direct application and removal of fingers, as opposed to keys, from pre-historical bone flutes to the modern Irish flute. The presence of keys (as found on the Classical flutes described above) does not preclude categorization as a "simple system" flute, as long as the primary tone holes are not keyed.

Related links
Charles Nicholson (flautist)

Further reading

External links
http://www.mcgee-flutes.com/5keyfingers.htm
http://www.oldflutes.com/german.htm

Side-blown flutes